Caryophyllaeus is a genus of flatworms belonging to the family Caryophyllaeidae.

The species of this genus are found in Europe and Northern America.

Species:
 Caryophyllaeus auriculatus (Kulakovskaya, 1961) 
 Caryophyllaeus balticus (Szidat, 1941)

References

Platyhelminthes